Lou's Blues is a big band jazz album by saxophonist Lou Marini and the Magic City Jazz Orchestra (MCJO) recorded at Bates Brothers Recording in Hueytown, Alabama (near Birmingham, Alabama).  This CD was the first recording as a leader by Marini.  Lou Marini is best known as a member of several noted bands, including Blood, Sweat and Tears, Steely Dan, the Woody Herman Orchestra, the Buddy Rich Band, The Maureen McGovern Band, the James Taylor Band, the Saturday Night Live Band, Aerosmith, Stevie Wonder and the Blues Brothers Band. Production duties for the album were shared by Lou Marini and Birmingham, Alabama based jazz musician Ray Reach.

All of the arrangements on this CD were written by Lou Marini, and all the compositions are his, except for "Mr. Clean," which was composed by Weldon Irvine.  Some of the charts on this album have become enduring favorites of the Lab Bands at the University of North Texas.  Liner notes for the CD were written by Grammy Award winning saxophonist, arranger, composer and producer, Bob Belden.

Track listing
 "Lou's Blues" 
 "Looking With New Eyes" 
 "Hip Pickles" 
 "Odalisk" 
 "Mr. Clean" 
 "Song For John" 
 "Dangerous Cargo" 
 "Rena / Country"

Magic City Jazz Orchestra (MCJO) Personnel

The MCJO personnel for Lou's Blues included:

 MCJO Founding Director:  Ray Reach
 Woodwinds:  Gary Hallquist, Gary Wheat, Neil McLean, Grady Chandler, Daniel Western and Kim Bain
 Trumpets:  Mart Avant, Chris Gordon, John Taylor, Craig Konicek, Bo Berry and Darryl Jones
 Trombones:  Steve Pryor, Edson Worden, Dr. Bob Black, Charles Ard, and Jim Moeller

External links
 Ray Reach - Official Website
 Magic City Jazz Orchestra at AllAboutJazz.com (Includes a reprint of the CD liner notes, written by Bob Belden.)
  Magic City Jazz Orchestra on Myspace
 Article from April 7, 2004 edition of the Sentinel-Tribune, Bowling Green, Ohio mentions Lou Marini and the Magic City Jazz Orchestra
 Lou's Blues reviews
 "Lou's Blues" CD at Amazon.com

References

2004 albums
Lou Marini albums